Pac-Man Museum is a 2014 compilation title developed and published by Bandai Namco Entertainment under the Namco label. It is a compilation of 9 (10 if Ms. Pac-Man is counted)  Pac-Man games, with additional features such as achievements and online leaderboards.

It was released digitally on February 26, 2014, for Xbox 360 and PlayStation 3, but was released on Steam and the North American PlayStation Store a day earlier (February 25, 2014). It was released in Japan for PS3 and Xbox 360 on June 25, 2014. Versions of the game for the Nintendo 3DS and Wii U were announced and intended to release on the Nintendo eShop, but was cancelled due to "delayed development". The game was delisted from all platforms on July 20, 2020.

A sequel, Pac-Man Museum +, has been released on May 27, 2022.

Overview
Pac-Man Museum features 9 (10 if Ms. Pac-Man is counted as well) games from the Pac-Man series, ranging from the original maze games, puzzle games and platformers. Each game is based on their original arcade/console release (Pac-Attack is based on the Genesis/Mega Drive version, while Pac-Man Arrangement is based on its Namco Museum Battle Collection port). Additional features in the compilation include a special guide mode for Pac-Man, online and offline leaderboards, and achievements (console versions only).

The game also features an award system for each game (minus Ms. Pac-Man) called the Stampbook. Completing an achievement adds a stamp to the Stampbook (with each stamp representing the bonus fruits from the original Pac-Man). There are 8 stamps to fill for each game, with medals being awarded to the player for completing each game. Additionally, filling in a stamp adds a character or object from Pac-Man and the Ghostly Adventures to the Pac-Room (which is also displayed in the main menu), where the player can view Pac-Man's apartment from the TV series and view all obtained characters and items. These items range from characters from the series (like Pac-Man and the Ghosts), objects (including a Pac-Man's Arcade Party machine), and figurines based on the characters (as well as Galaga cameos). As well as being able to view close-ups of the characters and objects, they are also accessible through the game's Item List, which also displays information regarding each item or character.

Games featured in Pac-Man Museum 
Pac-Man (1980)
 Ms. Pac-Man (1982) (Available as DLC)
 Super Pac-Man (1982)
 Pac & Pal (1983)
 Pac-Land (1984; based on the Japanese version)
 Pac-Mania (1987; based on the Japanese version)
 Pac-Attack (Genesis/Mega Drive version; 1993)
 Pac-Man Arrangement (PSP version as seen on Namco Museum Battle Collection; 2005)
 Pac-Man Championship Edition (2007)
 Pac-Man Battle Royale (2011)

Ms. Pac-Man was originally available as free downloadable content until March 31, 2014. On April 1, 2014, the game became a $4.99 in-game purchase.

Pac-Man, Ms. Pac-Man, Super Pac-Man, Pac & Pal, Pac-Mania and Pac-Man Arrangement lack the 2-player modes found in the original releases.

See also
List of Namco video game compilations

Reception 

Pac-Man Museum received a score of 66/100 on Metacritic, a score of 6/10 on Steam, and Hardcore Gamer gave the game a 4/5, calling it "the best representation of what has been a truly illustrious video game career."

Destructoid gave the game a 7/10 rating, saying "Pac-Man Museum has a bunch of middling pieces, but the addition of Battle Royale is the icing on the cake. If you've never played Championship Edition before and thus do not have DX to compare it to, it's a perfect way to re-acclimate yourself to the franchise, while you use Royale to spice up your next local gathering. Everyone else who lacks friends on-hand or has already played CE should wait for a sale, or pass this one up entirely."

References

Notes

External links
 "Pac-Man Museum collection coming to digital platforms, includes Pac-Man Battle Royale" - Joystiq
 "Pac-Man Museum hitting PSN, XBLA end of Feb., Ace Combat Infinity on PSN next week" - EGM Now 

2014 video games
Bandai Namco games
Bandai Namco video game compilations
Pac-Man
Windows games
Cancelled Nintendo 3DS games
Cancelled Wii U games
PlayStation 3 games
PlayStation Network games
Xbox 360 games
Xbox 360 Live Arcade games
Video games developed in Japan
Video games developed in China